Susan Stewart may refer to:
 Susan Stewart (poet) (born 1952), American poet and critic
 Susan Stewart (fencer) (born 1946), Canadian Olympic fencer
 Susan Stewart (As the World Turns), character in American soap opera As the World Turns
 Susan Stewart, Miley Stewart's deceased mother in Hannah Montana
 Susan Stewart (speed skater), Susan Massitti, (born 1963), Canadian Olympic speed skater

See also 
 Susan McKinney Steward (1847–1918), African-American physician